Phoenicoprocta hampsonii is a moth in the subfamily Arctiinae. It was described by William Barnes in 1904. It is found in the United States in south-eastern Arizona and in Mexico's Baja California.

The length of the forewings is about 17 mm. Adults are on wing from July to September.

References

Moths described in 1904
Euchromiina